The Companies Act 2014 (No. 38 of 2014) was signed into law by President Michael D. Higgins on 23 December 2014 to regulate companies under Irish law. It was a consolidating and reforming piece of legislation, incorporating many of the provisions of the previous Companies Act 1963–2012 listed below.

Previous Companies Acts
To facilitate easy citation of the entire body of law affecting companies, each of the acts prior to 2005 includes a collective citation section which enables them to be collectively cited as "The Companies Acts 1963 - [year of current enactment]". The Interpretation Act, 2005 provided that the Companies Acts 1963 to 2001 may be referred to as "The Companies Acts". Legislation enacted subsequent to the Interpretation Act, 2005 includes a section providing that "the Companies Acts and this Act shall be read as one" (e.g. Section 11 of The Companies (Amendment) Act 2009). Therefore, it was then appropriate to cite the entire body of legislation in Ireland affecting companies as "The Companies Acts".
 Companies Act, 1963
 Companies (Amendment) Act, 1977
 Companies (Amendment) Act, 1982
 Companies (Amendment) Act, 1983
 Designated Investment Funds Act, 1985
 Companies (Amendment) Act 1986
 Companies (Amendment) Act, 1990
 Companies Act, 1990
 Companies (Amendment) Act, 1999
 Companies (Amendment) (Number 2) Act, 1999
 Company Law Enforcement Act, 2001
 Companies (Auditing and Accounting) Act, 2003
 Companies (Amendment) Act 2009
 Companies (Amendment) Act 2012

References

Irish business law
2014 in Irish law